Columbus, Ohio shooting may refer to:

Columbus nightclub shooting, a mass shooting at a nightclub that killed five, including musician Dimebag Darrell and the gunman
Killing of Andre Hill, the fatal shooting of an African American man by Columbus police in 2020
Killing of Ma'Khia Bryant, the fatal shooting of an African American girl by Columbus police in 2021